Varnhalt is a district of Baden-Baden in the state of Baden-Württemberg in southwestern Germany. It has about 2,000 residents.

The village is situated at an altitude of 204 meters on the western slope of the Yberg (517 m), south-west of Baden-Baden. Viticulture and the wine trade are the main sources of income of its inhabitants.

Photo gallery 

Villages in Baden-Württemberg